Omeros Corporation, also known as Omeros, is an American biopharmaceutical company based in Seattle, Washington. It was founded in 1994 by Gregory A. Demopulos and Pamela Pierce Palmer. As of January 2020, it employs two hundred and sixty-five workers.

Products
Omeros mainly produces small molecules and antibodies. It has eight products, and as of August 2021, only Omidria is fully marketed; the others are in different trial phases.

List of products:
Small molecules:
Omidria
OMS405
OMS527
MASP-2, MASP-3, MASP-2/3
GPR174
GPR161
Antibodies:
Narsoplimab
OMS906

References

External links
 A list of all the funding Omeros Corportion has received from the Small Business Innovation Research (sbir.gov)

Pharmaceutical companies of the United States
Biopharmaceutical companies
Companies based in Seattle
American companies established in 1994
1994 establishments in Washington (state)